The women's hammer throw event at the 2002 Asian Athletics Championships was held in Colombo, Sri Lanka on 9 August.

Results

References

2002 Asian Athletics Championships
Hammer throw at the Asian Athletics Championships
2002 in women's athletics